The University of Science and Culture (in Persian: Daneshgah Elm va Farhang) is located in Tehran, Iran. University of Science and Culture is a research institution and university of engineering, science and art, offering both undergraduate and postgraduate studies. USC is one of the largest and most prestigious of the non-governmental universities in Iran.

History
University of Science and Culture (USC) was founded in 1992 as a non-governmental university by Iranian Academic Center for Education, Culture and Research (ACERC) with a special permit by Ministry of Science, Research and Technology, Iran. The very first name of this university was Jahad Daneshgahi Higher Education Institute (division 2 of AmirKabir).

Academics

USC is one of the largest and most prestigious of non-governmental universities in Iran. USC has 70 full-time faculty members, approximately 300 part-time faculty members and a student body of approximately 10,000.

In domestic courses, the university admits students who pass national entrance examinations (called concours) in 20 undergraduate programs, six graduate programs and 15 technical courses. Admission rules differ for international courses. The USC is active in education through its faculties in engineering technology, humanities, and arts.

Bachelor's programs
 Law
 Software Engineering
 Electrical Engineering
 Civil engineering
 Statistics
 Management
 Industrial Engineering
 Accounting
 Architecture
 Painting
 Photography
 Graphics
 Fabric and Clothing
 Psychology
 Safety engineering
 Molecular and Cell Biology
 Microbiology
 Biotechnology

Master's programs
Civil Engineering-Water and Hydraulic Structures Engineering
 Civil Engineering-Structural Engineering
 Civil Engineering-Earthquake Engineering
 Financial Engineering
 Industrial Engineering
 Law
 MBA-Strategic
 Art Research
 Clinical Psychology
 Eco-tourism
 Cultural Studies
 Geography-Tourism Planning
 Molecular And Cell Biology
 Electrical Engineering-Power Electronics & Electrical machines
 Computer Engineering - Software Engineering

Doctoral (Ph.D.) programs
 Civil Engineering-Structural Engineering
 Biology
 Law
 Clinical Psychology
 Tourism Management

Board of Education
The university benefits from 105 full-time members of the board of education in its faculties. Members of the board in research institutes of ACECR and of other universities also cooperate with USC.

Mission of the USC
Because USC is connected to ACECR, the school is obliged to develop scientific and higher education systems at national and international levels, as well as expand non-state higher education, train students in theory and practice in different majors and courses, and provide specialized human resources in line with the 20-year national plan of the IRI.

The following objectives and programs are approved by the board of trustees of the USC.

"To achieve an acceptable and effective position at the higher education system of the country."
"To promote the quality and quantity of research and educational activities based upon the standards set by the Ministry of Higher Education and in line with the scientific-research orientation of the ACECR."
"To train students' creativity, skills, capability, and scientific talents, to increase the morale of self-esteem and self-confidence in science, and to create the sense of responsibility among students."
"To transcend culture and to strengthen Islamic values and ethical virtues among students."
"To design, program, and develop new majors and multi discipline majors required by society."
"To expand and enrich postgraduate programs."
"To offer employment-oriented and job-making courses."
"To attract outstanding, talented, and capable students."
"To expand research and scientific cooperation with the ACECR research centers."
"Scientific cooperation with prestigious overseas universities."

Campuses

The university's main campus is in Tehran's west district; additional campuses are in Isfahan, Rasht, Hamedan, Tehran and Kashmar.

There are two building complexes at the USC. The education building complex is at the central building, which is part of the art faculty and the postgraduate education buildings.

In addition to the library facilities, the USC is connected to information banks. They have enabled the use of the latest scientific sources and local and international scientific research magazines for the members of the board of education and the students. There are equipped laboratories and workshops required by different departments in faculties on the campus.

The research activities at USC are done at the related research centers which consist of Ruyan Research Institute, Technology Development Institute, Culture and Art Institute, and Social Studies and Humanities Institute. The Department of Research at USC is responsible for helping students and board members research, especially postgraduate students.

References

External links
 University of Science and Culture Website 

Sci
Educational institutions established in 1992
1992 establishments in Iran